In the game of Go, shape describes the positional qualities of a group of stones. Descriptions of shapes in go revolve around how well a group creates or removes life and territory. Good shape can refer to the efficient use of stones in outlining territory, the strength of a group in a prospective fight, or making eye shapes so that a group may live. Bad shapes are inefficient in outlining territory and are heavy. Heavy groups cannot easily make eye shapes and are therefore good targets for attack. Understanding and recognizing the difference between good shape and bad is an essential step in becoming a stronger player.

Shape is not a rule; the surrounding position must always be taken into account. While it is useful for beginners to learn the common good and bad shapes presented here, sometimes a usually bad shape can be the best shape to play locally. This can be true if it forces the opponent to create an equally bad or worse shape, or if it accomplishes a specific tactical goal, such as the creation of eye-shape or the capture of an opponent's group.

"To make shape is to take a weak or defective position...and transform it into a strong one. Sometimes this can be done just by putting one stone down in the right place, but usually it takes sacrifice tactics...."

Good Shapes

 The  is a move to be played when black and white stones are standing side by side and the player who plays diagonally at the end of the opponent's group gains an advantage. This play turns the mutual walls, whereby a player can both expand one's influence and press the opponent down.  The Turn at the head of two (or three) stones is used to seize the initiative and to create a thick position.
 The , or two-step hane is two Turns played in succession. It can be an aggressive and appropriate move, but it generally exposes the group of stones to cutting.
 The  is a generally conservative move that allows the stones connected by a Diagonal to be connected, even in the event of a cut, barring outside influences, as there are two cutting points. The Diagonal can also be used to attack into a shape or to solidify border territory.
 The , especially from the middle of three stones, is often the vital point in making good shape. An old Go proverb says, "Don't try to cut the one space jump." This is for good reason, as it is difficult to disconnect without a kikashi. It can also be the vital point for destroying the enemy's shape. The proverb, "my opponent's vital point is my vital point," often applies in regard to shape. Another way to say it is, "what is good for black is good for white." That is, if you can play there first, then you can destroy their shape.
 The  is more fast-paced than either the diagonal move or the one-space jump. It is named after the resemblance to the movement of the Knight in Chess. It also makes a flexible and light shape and is useful in sabaki. Near the edge of the board the small knight's move is used to secure a base or to link up stones. However this shape can easily be cut. Hence, you must consider the surrounding stones and be prepared to sacrifice one of your own stones to make good shape. It is sometimes called the Small Knight's Move in order to differentiate it from the Large Knight's Move.
 The  is a more aggressive version of the Small Knight's Move, and can be cut even more easily. It extends one square further, and is usually used in conjunction with stones already in the area that provide support for this move.
 The  is a connection that renders solid a series of previous free-standing stones, into a line, which allows for solidarity and more influence.
 The  is a shape that has high defensive capabilities, in that, in order to cut any point of the shape, the opponent must either build up support around the shape or risk an atari when the invading stone is played without any support. It also exerts influence and support in every direction, and can be used to stage further attacks. This shape can be the result of playing with or without capturing an enemy stone - if an enemy stone was captured in the process, it is known as ponnuki; the resulting shape is a Diamond.
 The  is a fundamental shape, good for forming an eye. It is half of a square, 2 stones by 2 stones in an "L".  Its vital point is across the square, on the far "corner".
 The  is a very effective shape for preventing the escape of an enemy's stones and for sabaki.
 The , or Hanging Connection, is a one stone short of a Diamond shape. It is so-called because an attacking stone would be under atari immediately if played directly in the "mouth" of the group.
 The , or Trumpet Connection, guards against two different possible attacks on a stone by creating two Tiger's Mouths at the vulnerable cutting points.
 The  is safe and can only be cut if short of liberties. whereas the one-space jump is good shape for outlining territory but can be cut by de-giri (to push through then cut and capture the weak side). The Bamboo Joint is the essence of flexibility. It has the beauty of an either-or choice, so that even if the opponent attacks first, you have a safe response.

Bad Shapes

 The  is an undesirable formation of three stones that inefficiently removes liberties and creates a weak group.
 The  is not inherently a bad shape, but the inability to recognize when one is trapped in a ladder shape that cannot be won, can be fatal.
 The  is any shape where a group of stones has been forced into a closely packaged lump with few liberties, no eyes and limited ability to counterattack.

See also
 Go terms
 Ponnuki

Books

References